India competed at the 2022 Winter Olympics in Beijing, China, from 4 to 20 February 2022.

India's team consisted of one male alpine skier. Arif Khan was the country's flagbearer during the opening ceremony. Meanwhile a volunteer was the flagbearer during the closing ceremony.

Boycott
The Ministry of External Affairs decided that Indian envoy will not attend the opening or closing ceremony of the Beijing Winter Olympics because of China making a Galwan soldier a torchbearer.

Competitors

Alpine skiing

By meeting the basic qualification standards, India qualified one male alpine skier Arif Khan. He competed in Slalom and Giant Slalom events.

See also
India at the 2022 Commonwealth Games
India at the 2022 Asian Games

References

Nations at the 2022 Winter Olympics
22022002 Winter Olympics
2022 in Indian sport